Snegovo is an abandoned village in the municipality of Bitola, North Macedonia.

Demographics
The village of Snegovo, when inhabited in the past was traditionally and exclusively populated by Muslim Albanians.

In statistics gathered by Vasil Kanchov in 1900, the village of Snegovo was inhabited by 45 Muslim Albanians.

According to the 2002 census, the village had a total of 0 inhabitants.

References

External links

Villages in Bitola Municipality
Albanian communities in North Macedonia